Outlet obstruction may refer to:

 Gastric outlet obstruction (GOO)
 Bladder outlet obstruction (BOO)
 Rectal outlet obstruction (obstructed defecation)
  Thoracic outlet obstruction
  Sinus outlet obstruction